The Claremont Park station was a station on the New York Central Railroad's Harlem Line in the East Morrisania neighborhood of the Bronx, New York City. The New York, New Haven and Hartford Railroad also ran through this station but did not stop here.

History

Rail service along the New York and Harlem Railroad passed through Morrisania as far back as 1841, and a station was known to exist as far back as 1847, but this wasn't the station. Instead an additional station was built by New York Central and Hudson River Railroad within the vicinity of 172nd Street/Wendover Avenue as far back as the late-1860s. Originally named Central Morrisania station, it was built at surface level along with the rest of the tracks.

Realizing the railroad was causing suburban sprawl within what was then southern Westchester County, the New York City Parks Department acquired the site of the former Claremont Mansion one block to the west in 1888, and converted it into a park. 

The station was renamed for that park roughly around the time Claremont Park station was rebuilt by New York Central in April 1891, as part of a grade elimination project within the Bronx. It contained a station house as a bridge on the north side of Claremont Parkway over all four tracks, with two side platforms. Similar structures were built for the former Morrisania Station, as well as the still operating Melrose and Tremont Stations. A small freight yard also used to exist north of the station between the Claremont Parkway and 173rd Street bridges, the remnants of which can still be seen to this day. Three blocks east, the Suburban Rapid Transit Company built the Third Avenue Elevated Line and installed a station along the same street in 1888. No streetcar or bus lines connected the two stations to one another, however.

Declining ridership following World War II, along with the decline of the South Bronx lead to the downfall of various stations within the Bronx, along with competition with the subway, the el, and the automobile. Local politicians also demanded that New York Central take better care of the stations in the Bronx, which they weren't always able to do at the time. On September 14, 1950, the Public Service Commission ended hearings about the New York Central's petition to discontinue service at this station and the 183rd Street station. The Central wanted to close the station to cut travel times on trains to Westchester. Claremont Park station was closed in 1960. As a result of the closure, commuters were forced to take either Morrisania station, Tremont station, or the nearby Claremont Parkway elevated station. Of the three mentioned, only Tremont station survives today.

References

External links
Claremont Park Topo Map in Bronx County NY (TopoZone.com)

Former railway stations in New York (state)
Former New York Central Railroad stations
Railway stations in the Bronx

Railway stations closed in 1960